The Fair Air Association of Canada (FAAC) was a Canadian non-profit association incorporated in 2003. It supports the Canadian hospitality sector in its efforts to promote ventilation solutions. This association does not exist anymore.

The Fair Air Association of Canada is involved in a number of research projects that provide advice on issues of concern to the hospitality industry. From studying the economic impact of smoking bans to testing effective ventilation solutions in a variety of locations, it provides scientifically validated information to help inform the public and political decision-makers.

Members include several thousand bar and pub owners, more than a thousand hotel operators, charitable gaming (bingo) operators and charities in Ontario and eastern Canada. Membership also includes tobacco and ventilation manufacturers, ventilation engineers and many others.

Trade associations based in Canada